Dumdum is a village in Bhabua block of Kaimur district, Bihar, India. As of 2011, its population was 2,281, in 368 households.

References 

Villages in Kaimur district